Leatherhead is a town in Surrey, England.

Leatherhead may also refer to:

 Leatherhead F.C., a football club in Surrey, England
 Leatherhead (helmet), headgear formerly worn by firefighters and policemen in New York City
 Leatherhead (TMNT), a large mutant alligator character in Teenage Mutant Ninja Turtles
 Leatherheads, a film about American football with George Clooney
 Friarbird, species of honeyeaters in the genus Philemon
 Leatherhead railway station, railway station in Surrey, England

See also
 Leatherface